Ian Holliday (born 1960) is a scholar with expertise in British and Asian Government, particularly Myanmar. He is currently the vice-president and pro-vice-chancellor (teaching and learning) of The University of Hong Kong (HKU). He graduated with a Bachelor of Arts degree (BA) in social and political science at Gonville and Caius College, Cambridge, in 1982, before completing his doctor of philosophy (DPhil) degree in politics at New College, Oxford, in 1989. He taught at University of Kent, University of Manchester (1990–99), New York University, and City University of Hong Kong (from 1999) before teaching at the University of Hong Kong (from 2006), he once served as Deputy Dean of Academy of Social Sciences of Hong Kong University. In 2014, he was appointed vice-president of the University of Hong Kong.

Myanmar

Art
Holliday has been an advocate for assisting Burmese artists who have been repressed by the military government in Myanmar, in 2014 co-curating an art show for banned artists, as well as writing the book Painting Myanmar's Transition in 2021.

Books
Holliday is co-editor of the book Routledge Handbook of Contemporary Myanmar and of Painting Myanmar's Transition. He is author of Burma Redux: Global Justice and the Quest for Political Reform in Myanmar, and coauthor of Liberalism and Democracy in Myanmar. He is widely cited as an expert on Myanmar (Burma).

References

1960 births
Living people
Alumni of the University of Oxford
Alumni of the University of Cambridge
Academics of the University of Manchester
New York University faculty
Academic staff of the City University of Hong Kong
Academic staff of the University of Hong Kong